Chokri may refer to:

Chokri language
Chokri, alternative of Shukri, an Arabic-based given name and surname